Christine Brand (born 11 April 1973, Burgdorf, Switzerland) is a Swiss writer and journalist.

Life 
Christine Brand grew up in Oberburg in Emmental. She completed her training as a teacher at the teachers' seminar in Langenthal. After an internship at the Berner Zeitung, she became editor there. From 1996 to 2004, she was editor and court reporter in the department "Canton" of the newspaper The Bund, starting in 2003 with reduced workloads. From 2003 to 2005, she was Correspondent for Canton and City of Bern of a pool of daily newspapers Basler Zeitung, Aargauer Zeitung, Southeastern Switzerland and St. Galler Tagblatt. In 2005, she completed an apprenticeship as a television journalist on the editorial board of the "Rundschau" of Swiss television, with two external internships at the Federal Parliament and in Geneva. From 2006 to 2008 she was editor of the "Rundschau". From June 2008 until the end of 2017, she was editor at the NZZ am Sonntag in the section "Background and Opinions".

In 2013 she was awarded the Media Prize of the Swiss Bar Association for a court reports. For a report on family killings, she received the media prize of SRG SSR idée suisse.

She teaches "storytelling" and "reportage" as a lecturer in the journalism course at Adult Education Zurich.

After being signed by Blanvalet publisher of the Random House Publishing, she wants to become self-employed in 2018 as a writer. In journalism, she only wants to work as a freelance author.

Brand is a member of the associations Autorengruppe deutschsprachige Kriminalliteratur – Das Syndikat and Authors of Switzerland. She lives in Zurich.

Publications

Bandini-&-Nova-Thriller 
 Blind, Blanvalet, Zürich 2019, 
 Die Patientin, Blanvalet, Zürich 2020, 
 Der Bruder, Blanvalet, Zürich 2021,

Novels 
 Mond: Geschichten aus aller Welt, Unionsverlag, Zürich 2016, 
 Stiller Hass, Landverlag, Langnau 2015, 
 Kalte Seelen, Landverlag, Langnau 2013, 
 Das Geheimnis der Söhne, Landverlag, Langnau 2010, 
 Todesstrich, Landverlag, Langnau 2009, 
 Schattentaten: wahre Kriminalgeschichten ans Licht gebracht, Stämpfli, Bern 2008,

Short stories 
 Im Ameisenhaufen, Appenzeller Verlag, Schwellbrunn 2016, 
 Totes Vieh, Landverlag, Langnau 2015, 
 Grüngesprenkelte Augen, Vidal Verlag, Winterthur 2014, 
 Toter Hund, Gmeiner, Messkirch 2013, 
 Tod am Napf, Landverlag, Langnau 2012, 
 Lochbach-Geist, Landverlag, Langnau 2009, 
 Späte Rache, Landverlag, Langnau 2008, 
 Heimliche Touristenattraktion, Kulturbuchverlag, Burgdorf 2009,

References

External links 
 Official website Christine Brand
 
 
 Philippe Zweifel: Die nordischen Autoren haben eine Grenze erreicht. Tages-Anzeiger 17 April 2013 (Interview)

21st-century Swiss novelists
Swiss columnists
21st-century Swiss journalists
Swiss women journalists
Swiss women novelists
1973 births
Living people
21st-century Swiss women writers
Swiss women columnists
People from Burgdorf, Switzerland